William Allman, M.D. (1776–1846) was  Professor of Botany at Dublin.

He was born at Kingston, Jamaica, on 7 February 1776, but his parents removed to Ireland before he was four years of age, his mother being a native of Waterford. He was educated in that town, and Trinity College Dublin, where he was elected a Scholar, and graduated B.A. in 1796, M.A. in 1801, and M.D. in 1804. He practised medicine in Clonmel until 1809 when he was elected Professor of Botany at the University of Dublin. Soon after this event he became acquainted with Robert Brown, the botanist, with whom his friendship was lifelong. 

In consequence of this intimacy, Dr. Allman arranged lectures in 1812 on the natural system, he being the first professor in the British isles to do so. He held the chair of botany until 1844 when he was succeeded by Dr. George James Allman; but he did not long enjoy his well-earned leisure, for he died on 8 December 1846.

In addition to the two mathematical papers mentioned in the 'Catalogue of Scientific Papers', he wrote 'On the Mathematical Relations of the Forms of the Cells of Plants', in the 'British Association Report' for 1835, erroneously attributed in the above-mentioned catalogue to his successor. He was also the author of an 'arrangement of plants' according to their natural affinities, which was read before the British Association at Dublin in 1835, and printed in its 'Proceedings'. This was afterwards more developed and issued under the title 'Familiæ Plantarum', Dublin, 1836, as a textbook for his classes. 

His best-known work is a thin quarto entitled 'Analysis per differentias constantes viginti, inchoata, generum plantarum quæ in Britanniis, Gallia, Helvetia . . . sponte sua crescunt', London, 1828. In 1844 he privately brought out an abstract of a memoir read in 1811 before the Royal Society, but not printed, on the mathematical connection between the external organs of plants and their internal structure.

Allman's son, George (1824–1904),was a mathematician, classical scholar, and historian of ancient Greek mathematics.

References

1776 births
1846 deaths
Alumni of Trinity College Dublin
19th-century Irish botanists
People from Kingston, Jamaica
Scholars of Trinity College Dublin